Capital D (real name David J. Kelly), also known as Cap D, is an underground rapper and lawyer from Chicago, Illinois. He is known for his solo work, his collaboration with Tony Fields as the duo "All Natural," and for founding the label All Natural Records, on which all his music has been released.

Early life and education
Kelly grew up in a Catholic family on the South Side of Chicago, before his family moved to Flossmoor, where he attended Homewood-Flossmoor High School. He later attended Morehouse College (B.A., 1996) and the University of Illinois Law School. (J.D., 2004).

Musical career
Kelly started the label "All Natural" in 1997, on which he released his first album, Writer's Block (The Movie) with The Molemen, in 2002. He was also a member of a rap group, also called "All Natural", with Tony Fields, aka "Tony B. Nimble", which they started in 1993. This duo intended to release their first single, "50 Years", on the short-lived label Wild Pitch. After this label folded, they started the All Natural label to release "50 Years," and on which they released their debut album, No Additives, No Preservatives, in 1998. Greg Kot praised the album as one of "the year's freshest rap releases" and wrote that "Though it lacks the cinematic production of the best East Coast hip-hop, it marks the arrival of an assertive and unusually insightful new voice in Kelly." He released his second solo album, Insomnia, in 2004 on the same label, shortly after he received his law degree. Insomnia was noted for its heavily political themes, which led some critics to compare it to Noam Chomsky, and was also highlighted for addressing Kelly's newfound religion of Islam. All Natural's third album, Vintage, was released in 2005 and was also heavily influenced by Kelly's religious views.

Kelly released his third album, Return of the Renegade, as "Cap D" in 2007. He described this album as more for the sake of hip-hop and less of a bold political statement than Insomnia had been. His fourth album, Polymath, was released in 2010, also under the alias of "Cap D". Kot ranked it as the best indie Chicago album of that year.

Legal career
Kelly also formerly worked as a transactional associate at Katten Muchin Rosenman, where he frequently did work for local sports teams such as the Chicago White Sox. He currently works as Vice President and General Counsel for the Golden State Warriors.

Personal life
Kelly converted to Islam in 2000. He is married and has three children.

Discography

Solo
Writer's Block (the Movie)  (All Natural, 2002)
Insomnia (All Natural, 2004)
(as Cap D) Return of the Renegade (All Natural, 2007)
(as Cap D) Polymath (All Natural, 2010)

With All Natural
Writers' Block (All Natural single, 1997)
No Additives, No Preservatives (All Natural, 1998)
Second Nature (All Natural, 2001)
Vintage (All Natural, 2005)
Elements (Fire) (All Natural, 2008)
Dark Night (All Natural & Panik, 2020)

References

Rappers from Chicago
Living people
20th-century births
American Muslims
Morehouse College alumni
University of Illinois College of Law alumni
Underground rappers
Converts to Islam from Catholicism
Illinois lawyers
People from Flossmoor, Illinois
21st-century American rappers
Year of birth missing (living people)
Homewood-Flossmoor High School alumni